It was the ninth season of the Vietnam Futsal League, the Vietnam professional futsal league for association football clubs.
This season is hold by VFF and VOV Channel. The main sponsorship of this season are HD Bank and Cityland.

Teams changes

New clubs
 Vietfootball

Renamed clubs
 Sanatech Sanest Khánh Hòa

Rule changes
In this season, there are 2 stages. At the end of the First stage, 4 of 6 teams will be qualified to the Second stage, where we have 10 teams (6 automatic qualifications and 4 qualifications). The champion will be qualified to AFC Futsal Club Championship, while the runner-up will be qualified to AFF Futsal Club Championship.

First stage
All matches are held in Tiên Sơn Arena, Đà Nẵng from 1 May 2018 to 9 May 2018.

League table

Second stage
Matches of the first leg are held in Tiên Sơn Arena, Đà Nẵng from 13 May to 3 June 2018. Matches of the second leg are held in Lãnh Bình Thăng Gymnasium, Hồ Chí Minh City from 7 September to 29 September 2018.

League table

Season awards

References

External links
Official Page

2018 in Vietnamese football